Sir Frederick John Pollock, 4th Baronet (26 Dec 1878 – 22 July 1963) was an English historian, journalist and translator.

Life 

John Pollock was the son of Sir Frederick Pollock, 3rd Baronet and Georgina Harriet Deffell, younger daughter of John Deffell, of Calcutta. He was educated at Eton College, graduated in 1900, and continued his education at Trinity College, Cambridge (Bachelor of Arts, Fellow 1902, Master of Arts 1904).

From 1915 to 1919, John Pollock was in Poland and Russia as chief commissioner of the Great Britain to Poland and Galicia Fund under the Russian Red Cross. He was awarded the Order of Saint Anna.

In 1920 he married  famous Russian actress Lydia Borisovna Yavorskaya (Gubbenet / Hubbenet) (1874-1921), ex-wife of writer prince Vladimir Baryatinskiy. They had no children, and the next year she died.

On 28 April 1925 he married Alix Soubiran, daughter of Jean Julien I'Estom Soubiran, of Bordeaux. She died on 14 April 1968.

Pollock succeeded as 4th Baronet on 18 January 1937. He died on 22 July 1963 at age 84. Pollock's son, George Frederick Pollock (1928-2016), a photographer and inventor, succeeded to the baronetcy.

Works 
 The Popish Plot; A Study in the History of the Reign of Charles II (1903), London, Duckworth
 Lord Acton at Cambridge (1904)
 Three plays by Eugène Brieux (1911):
 Damaged Goods, translated by John Pollock
 Maternity (new version), translated by John Pollock
 War and Revolution in Russia (1918), London, Constable & Co Ltd
 The Bolshevik Adventure (1919), London, Constable & Co Ltd
 Anatole France himself: a Boswellian record by his secretary, Jean Jacques Brousson (1927, 1934), translated by John Pollock
 The everlasting bonfire (1940), London, Chapman & Hall
 Time's Chariot (1950)
 Curtain up (1958), London, P. Davies
 
 Twelve One-Acters (1926) The Cayme Press (Plays)
 Listening to Lacoste (1926) Mills & Boon (tennis)
 Paris and Parisians (1929) Geoffrey Bles

References

External links 
 
 
 

1878 births
1963 deaths
Alumni of Trinity College, Cambridge
Baronets in the Baronetage of the United Kingdom
English historians
English male journalists
English translators
People educated at Eton College
Recipients of the Order of St. Anna